William Arundell Bouverie (b Marylebone 6 February 1797 - d Denton, Norfolk 23 August 1877) was Archdeacon of Norfolk from 1850 until 1869.

Nevill was educated at Christ Church, Oxford. Later he was a Fellow at Merton. He was ordained in 1822.  He held livings at Hambledon, Surrey, Holywell, Oxford, West Tytherley and Denton, Norfolk.

Notes

1797 births
People from Marylebone
1877 deaths
19th-century English Anglican priests
Archdeacons of Norfolk
Alumni of Christ Church, Oxford
Fellows of Merton College, Oxford
People from Denton, Norfolk